The 2017–18 season was the second season for Sports Academy Tirur in the Kerala Premier League. They are competing group stage from Group A.

Kerala Premier League

Review and events
Sports Academy Tirur started their 2018–19 Kerala Premier League campaign with a victory over SBI Kerala on 19 December 2018.

Group A

Fixtures and results

Source: fanport

Statistics

Squad statistics

Goal scorers

References

See also
 2018–19 in Indian football
 2018–19 Kerala Premier League

Kerala Premier League